Alexander Carnegie Kirk  (16 July 1830 – 5 October 1892) was a Scottish engineer responsible for several major innovations in the shipbuilding, refrigeration, and oil shale industries of the 19th century. Kirk, born in Barry, Angus, received his formal education at the University of Edinburgh and a technical education at plants operated by Robert Napier and Sons.

Family
Alexander Carnegie Kirk was the eldest son of John Kirk (died 1858) and Christian Guthrie, née Carnegie, (died 1865). The naturalist John Kirk was his younger brother. A.C. Kirk married Ada Waller at Croydon in 1869 and they had six children.

Career

In 1850, Kirk began a five-year apprenticeship with Robert Napier and Sons. In 1861, he became chief draughtsman at Maudslay, Sons and Field in London but this seems to have lasted less than a year. Later in 1861 he became an engineering manager in the shale-oil industry, working for James Young. During this employment he developed an oil shale retort and a refrigeration technology, involving the delivery of ether. The latter was to address production problems stemming from summer heat. In 1865 he joined the management of James Aitken and Company, an engine works in Glasgow. In 1870 he was appointed manager of the John C. Elder engineering works. After returning to the Napier firm as a senior partner in 1877, his work was thereafter focused on marine engineering. His triple-expansion engines as designed for the steamship Propontis were unsuccessful, but his subsequent versions of the engine design, particularly those designed for the steamship Aberdeen, are credited as technological breakthroughs.

Professional appointments
He served as the President of The Institution of Engineers and Shipbuilders in Scotland from 1887 to 1889.

Honours
In 2020 he was inducted into the Scottish Engineering Hall of Fame.

See also
 Alexander Selligue
 James Young (Scottish chemist)
 Pumpherston retort

References

1830 births
1892 deaths
Presidents of the Institution of Engineers and Shipbuilders in Scotland
Scottish engineers
Scottish inventors
19th-century Scottish people
19th-century British engineers
People from Angus, Scotland
Alumni of the University of Edinburgh
British marine engineers
Oil shale in Scotland
Oil shale technology inventors
19th-century Scottish businesspeople
Scottish Engineering Hall of Fame inductees